Tibor Klampár (born 30 April 1953) is a male former international table tennis player from Hungary.

Table tennis career
From 1970 to 1982 he won several medals in singles, doubles, and team events in the World Table Tennis Championships and in the Table Tennis European Championships. He won the gold medal in a single event of the Table Tennis World Cup in 1981.

Klampár was also the first player to use speed glue in the late 1980s. He played Liang Geliang, a top Chinese defender at the time and beat him convincingly after applying speed glue to his racket as Liang, or any of the top Chinese players at the time had not experienced playing against an opponent using speed glue.

His five World Championship medals included two gold medals in the doubles with István Jónyer at the 1971 World Table Tennis Championships and the team event at the 1979 World Table Tennis Championships.

He also won two English Open titles.

See also
 List of table tennis players
 List of World Table Tennis Championships medalists

References

External links
Tibor Klampar at Table Tennis Media

1953 births
Hungarian male table tennis players
Olympic table tennis players of Hungary
Table tennis players at the 1988 Summer Olympics
Living people